American Turkish Friendship Association (ATFA) is a non-profit non-governmental organization founded in 2003 by members of the Gülen movement, made up of followers of the Islamic cleric Fethullah Gülen. Its stated goal is addressing the social and cultural needs of Turkish and American people living in the Washington D.C. Metropolitan Area.

ATFA's headquarters is at 3949 University Dr. Fairfax, Virginia 22030. ATFA also has 5 chapters in Virginia State located in Sterling, Charlottesville, Richmond, Newport News, and Norfolk.

See also
 American-Turkish Council
 Assembly of Turkish American Associations
 Federation of Turkish American Associations
 Lobbying in the United States
 Turkish Americans

References

External links
 

Organizations established in 2003
Turkey–United States relations
Turkish organizations and associations in the United States